The 1986 Calgary Stampeders finished in 4th place in the West Division with a 11–7 record. They made the playoffs due to a new rule, in which a fourth place team from one division can qualify for the playoffs as long as they earned more points than the third place team from the opposing division. However, the Stampeders would remain in the West division throughout the playoffs. They faced division rival Edmonton Eskimos in the West Semi-Finals, where they lost 27–18.

Offseason

CFL Draft - Stampeders Picks

Preseason

Regular season

Season Standings

Season schedule

Awards and records

1986 CFL All-Stars

Western All-Star Selections

Playoffs

West Semi-Final

References

Calgary Stampeders seasons
Calgary Stampeders Season, 1986